Omertà or Omertà, The Code of Silence is a Quebec television series of 11 forty-five-minute episodes, created by Luc Dionne and aired from January to April 1996 on Radio-Canada. In France, the series aired on France 3 in 1998.

A second season, titled Omertà II – The Code of Silence, had 14 forty-five minute episodes and was broadcast between September and December 1997 on Radio-Canada.

A third season, titled Omerta, The Last Men of Honor, had 13 episodes and was broadcast from January to April 1999, on Radio-Canada.

In 2012 Dionne produced and released a feature film sequel to the series. The film won the Billet d'or at the 15th Jutra Awards as the top-grossing Quebec film of 2012.

Synopsis
Omerta (which means code of silence) was a Canadian television drama series set in Montreal that chronicles a battle between the police and the Mafia. The police rely on inventive and unorthodox methods in their fight against the mobsters who follow their code loyally and cherish their family.

Commercial success
Omerta was the second most popular series in Quebec television history.  Filmed in French, it had a limited audience outside of francophone markets. An English series was planned as a result of this success.  These plans were shelved with the launch of David Chase's HBO series The Sopranos which post dated and paralleled Omerta on many levels.

Season I
11 Episodes
The National Security police squad hires investigator Pierre Gauthier (Michel Côté) and double agent François Pelletier (Luc Picard) to conduct a comprehensive survey aimed at shuttering the alleged godfather of the Mafia in Montreal, Giuseppe Scarfo (Dino Tavarone). In a clandestine manner, the director of the squad Gilbert Tanguay (Michael Dumont) delivers a vendetta and cons Scarfo who was caught in a love triangle for years. Gauthier has a passionate affair with the daughter of Scarfo, Gabrielle Provost (Brigitte Paquette).

Season II
14 episodes

While investigating the murder of an undercover officer, National Security discovers the links between organized crime, high finance and the Canadian intelligence service.

Season III
Episodes 1-6
An unprecedented internal war broke out in the Montreal Mafia, pitting Jimmy Vaccaro against Giuseppe Scarfo. The ambitious young gangster Nicky Balsamo (Orzari Romano) finds himself stuck between the two, as he tries to win back the heart of Vicky (Geneviève Rochette), the daughter of an Italian-Quebec politician.

Episodes 7-8
Having been forced into exile on the island of Caruba (imaginary country in the Caribbean, military dictatorship) following the murder of Jimmy Vaccaro, Nicky Balsamo began his own business while serving as an intermediary to the new Montreal godfather Gino Favara (Ron Lea ), which attempts to acquire a large shipment of gold from the Russian mafia. This plays an indirect role in events of the first two seasons that occur at the same time.

Episodes 9-13
Nicky Balsamo returned to Montreal for a position within the organization Gino while Pierre Gauthier (Michel Côte), being blackmailed, is forced to work for the Canadian Security Intelligence Service. Balsamo will be forced to make an alliance with Gauthier to protect Vicky.

Distribution

Season I

Season II
Michel Côté : Pierre Gauthier
Luc Picard : François Pelletier
Ron Lea : Gino Favara
Michel Dumont : Gilbert Tanguay
Brigitte Paquette : Gabrielle Provost
Sophie Lorain : Denise Deslongchamps
David La Haye : Rick Bonnard
Marc Messier : Paul Spencer
Claude Michaud : Georges Lemire
Sylvie Legault : Michèle Vallières
Vittorio Rossi : Tom Celano
Claude Maher : Guy Lalonde
Sylvain Massé : Gilles Boisclair
Germain Houde  : Carol Léveillé
Claude Blanchard : Roger Perreault
  — : Ronny Dante
  — : Roberto Panzonni
Manuel Tadros : Frank Vastelli
Louis Di Bianco : Carlo Lombardo
Aubert Pallascio  : John Slayton
Jean-Pierre Bergeron : Marc-André Théoret
Daniel Gadouas : Laurent Daignault
Éric Hoziel : Gaétan Laflèche
Richard Lemire : Yvon «le Pic» Cossette
Claudia Ferri : Christina Panzonni
  — : Robert Sauvageau
Claude Lemieux : Bertrand Fournel
Bruno Pelletier : Michel Bergevin
Jean-Claude Viens : Biker

Season III
Romano Orzari : Nicola «Nicky» Balsamo
Geneviève Rochette : Victoria «Vicky» Sogliuzzo
Ron Lea : Gino Favara
Paolo Noël : Tony Potenzza
Michel Côté : Pierre Gauthier
Tony De Santis : Jimmy Vaccaro
Dino Tavarone : Giuseppe Scarfo
Vittorio Rossi : Tom Celano
Richard Robitaille : Blackburn, alias «Linda Monette»
Claude Blanchard : Roger Perreault
  — : Ronny Dante
Germain Houde : Carol Léveillé
Roberto Medile  : Agostino Sogliuzzo
  — : Pierre Lavoie
  — : Jeremy
  — : Normand, amant de Vicky
Tony Conte : Vincenzo Spadollini
 Emidio Michetti : Andrea Balsamo
 Dennis O'Connor : «Fatso» Montemilio
  — : Gerry Assete
Claudia Ferri : Christina Panzonni
Louis Di Bianco : Carlo Lombardo
  — : Tony Barbella
  — : Général Mandèz
Tony Calabretta : Louis Russo
Deano Clavet : Angelo «Angy» Bogliozzi
John Dunn-Hill : Marco D'Ascola
Éric Hoziel : Gaétan Laflèche
Bruno Diquinzio : Tony «two»
  — : Pasquale
  — : Mme Sogliuzzo
Andrée Champagne : Juge
  — : Avocat de Jimmy
Jean-Guy Moreau : Réal Vincent
  — : Alain Valois
Roger Léger: Corto
  — : Procureur de la couronne
Claude Lemieux: Bertrand Fournel
Marcel LeBoeuf dans Marcel LeBoeuf

Awards
 Gemini: Best Drama Series 1996
 Gemini: Best Drama Series 1998
 Gemini: Best Drama Series 1999

Episodes

Chronology

1973
Season III – Episode 1

1983
Season III – Episode 1

1993
Season III – Episode 1

1994
Season III – Episodes 2-6

1995
Season I – 11 Episodes

Season III – Episode 7

1997
Season II – 14 Episodes

Season III – Episodes 8-9

1998
Season III – Episodes 9-13

External links

Ici Radio-Canada Télé original programming
1996 Canadian television series debuts
1999 Canadian television series endings
1990s Canadian drama television series
Television shows set in Montreal
Television series about organized crime
Works about organized crime in Canada